Swedish Antisemitic Union was an anti-Jewish organisation in the early 1920s. It promoted hostility towards Jews and also used the Swastika. The Swedish Antisemitic Union was in a sense, a forerunner to the Nazi parties that later evolved in Sweden. The organisation ceased to exist in 1931.

Antisemitism in Sweden
Nazism in Sweden